Yakubu Alfa (born 31 December 1990 in Minna) is a Nigerian football player who plays for Niger Tornadoes F.C. He plays as a central midfielder with scoring and assisting ability.

Career
Alfa moved on 8 January 2009 from Niger Tornadoes F.C. to Helsingborgs IF. After one year in which he earned two professional caps for his Swedish club Helsingborgs IF, his contract was sold by Skoda Xanthi on 31 January 2010. He had been linked in October 2009 with a move to Germinal Beerschot. In May 2011 he signed with AEK Larnaca. In March 2013, he moved to AS Trenčín.

International career

He represented his homeland at the 2007 FIFA U-17 World Cup in the Korea Republic, he won also with the Nigeria U-17 *Golden Eagles* the World Cup 2007. He won the goal of the tournament after curling the ball at top left-hand corner of the Colombia goalkeeper, his goal was rated by FIFA users as 4.4 out of 5 making him with one point ahead of Japan's Yoichiro Kakitani and was the Round of 16 match against Colombia at the FIFA U-17 World Cup Korea 2007.
On 15 December 2008 was called for the Nigerian under-20 national team for the African Cup of Nations U-20 2009 in Rwanda, scored a goal against Egypt. On 3 March 2010 earned his first call-up for the Super Eagles.

Titles
 2007 FIFA U-17 World Cup

External links

References

1990 births
Living people
Nigerian footballers
Expatriate footballers in Sweden
Nigerian expatriate sportspeople in Sweden
Helsingborgs IF players
AEK Larnaca FC players
AS Trenčín players
Slovak Super Liga players
Allsvenskan players
Cypriot First Division players
Expatriate footballers in the Netherlands
Nigeria international footballers
Nigeria under-20 international footballers
Association football forwards
Nigerian expatriate footballers
Niger Tornadoes F.C. players
Nigerian expatriate sportspeople in the Netherlands
Nigerian expatriate sportspeople in Greece
Nigerian expatriate sportspeople in Cyprus
Nigerian expatriate sportspeople in Slovakia
Expatriate footballers in Cyprus
Expatriate footballers in Slovakia
Expatriate footballers in Greece